Jurvetson is a surname. Notable people with the surname include:

 Karla Jurvetson (born 1965/1966), American physician, ex-wife of Steve
 Reet Jurvetson (1950–1969), Canadian-American murder victim
 Steve Jurvetson (born 1967), American businessman and venture capitalist